Craig James may refer to:

Craig James (politician) (born 1941), U.S. Representative from Florida
Craig James (running back) (born 1961), American football commentator and former player
Craig James (economist) (born 1962), Australian economist
Craig James (footballer, born 1982), English footballer
Craig James (defensive back) (born 1996), American football safety

See also
James Craig (disambiguation)